Enneapterygius atrogulare is a species of triplefin blenny in the genus Enneapterygius. Although it is known as the blackthroat triplefin in the United Kingdom, it is also known as the ring-scale triplefin, black triplefin, eastern white-barred threefin, ringed triplefin, eastern Australian blackhead triplefin or the saddled triplefin in Australia. It is a subtropical, non-migratory blenny found in coral reefs in the western Pacific Ocean, around Australia and Tonga. Blackthroat triplefins swim at a depth range of 0–5 metres, and both juveniles and adults feed primarily on benthic algae, weeds, and invertebrates. Male E. atrogulare can reach a maximum length of 5 centimetres.

References

External links
 Enneapterygius atrogulare at www.fishwise.co.za
 Enneapterygius atrogulare at World Register of Marine Species
 Enneapterygius atrogulare at ITIS

atrogulare
Fish described in 1873
Taxa named by Albert Günther